Andrew Bosman (16 May 1917 – 16 May 1947) was a South African flying ace of World War II, scoring 10½ kills.

He joined the Permanent Force before World War II and later joined the South African Air Force. He joined 3 Squadron SAAF in the Western Desert in 1941. He took command of 3 Squadron SAAF in April 1942 but his tour was cut short. After a break from operations he joined 72 Squadron in December 1943. He later became Wing Commander (Flying) of 7 Wing, SAAF. In July 1945 he took command of 7 Wing and promoted to Colonel but VJ day stopped his deployment to the Far East

After the war, he went back to the rank of Major in command of 1 Squadron SAAF.

He was killed when a Lockheed Ventura, ferrying pilots to collect Spitfires in England, crashed in Khartoum.

References

Companions of the Distinguished Service Order
Recipients of the Distinguished Flying Cross (United Kingdom)
South African World War II flying aces
1917 births
1947 deaths
South African military personnel of World War II
People from Bloemhof